Kingston St Mary is a village and parish in Somerset, England, situated at the southern end of the Quantock Hills  north of Taunton in the Somerset West and Taunton district.  The village has a population of 921.

The parish includes the hamlets of Yarford which includes the grade II Cutley Farmhouse and Fulford where Fulford House was built about 1830, which has been designated by English Heritage as a grade II listed building.

History
The first part of the village name comes from the kings settlement having belonged to the kings of the West Saxons before being ceded to the Bishop of Winchester as part of the manor of Taunton Deane, with the church's dedication being added in the 20th century.

The parish of Kingston was part of the Taunton Deane Hundred.

Governance
The parish council has responsibility for local issues, including setting an annual precept (local rate) to cover the council's operating costs and producing annual accounts for public scrutiny. The parish council evaluates local planning applications and works with the local police, district council officers, and neighbourhood watch groups on matters of crime, security, and traffic. The parish council's role also includes initiating projects for the maintenance and repair of parish facilities, as well as consulting with the district council on the maintenance, repair, and improvement of highways, drainage, footpaths, public transport, and street cleaning. Conservation matters (including trees and listed buildings) and environmental issues are also the responsibility of the council.

The village falls within the non-metropolitan district of Somerset West and Taunton, which was established on 1 April 2019. It was previously in the district of Taunton Deane, which was formed on 1 April 1974 under the Local Government Act 1972, and part of Taunton Rural District before that. The district council is responsible for local planning and building control, local roads, council housing, environmental health, markets and fairs, refuse collection and recycling, cemeteries and crematoria, leisure services, parks, and tourism.

Somerset County Council is responsible for running the largest and most expensive local services such as education, social services, libraries, main roads, public transport, policing and  fire services, trading standards, waste disposal and strategic planning.

It is also part of the Taunton Deane county constituency represented in the House of Commons of the Parliament of the United Kingdom. It elects one Member of Parliament (MP) by the first past the post system of election.

Landmarks
The manor house on Lodes Lane dates from around 1560. It was originally known as Lodes and was probably built for Robert Knight whose descendants subsequently altered it.

Tetton House dates from 1790 and was enlarged and mainly rebuilt in 1924-6 by Harry Stuart Goodhart-Rendel for H M Herbert.

The Grange was built around 1862, by Sir George Gilbert Scott for Mr Steele Perkins, and was visited by the future prime minister Anthony Eden during his holidays. It was later converted into an old peoples home. It is unlikely that the Grange was built by Scott but according to letters from Scott's architect Richard Coad, Scott did 'trifling alterations to a small house for Mr Perkins'.

Kingston St Mary, has long been home to a country & folk music festival located at Yarford Farm, named Yarstock.  Having run since the mid 2000s, the festival has taken on cult status in some circles.

Religious sites
The Church of St Mary in Kingston St Mary on the Quantock Hills dates from the 13th century but the tower is from the early 16th century and was reroofed in 1952, with further restoration 1976–8. It is a 3-stage crenellated tower, with crocketed pinnacles with bracketed pinnacles set at angles, decorative pierced merlons, and set back buttresses crowned with pinnacles. The decorative "hunky-punks" are perched high on the corners. There may be so named because the carvings are hunkering (squatting) and punch (short and thick). They serve no function, unlike gargoyles which carry off water. The churchyard includes tombs of the Warre family who owned nearby Hestercombe House.

References

External links
 Village website

Villages in Taunton Deane
Civil parishes in Somerset